Mansel Harry Bates (4 August 1912 – 14 December 1980) was Archdeacon of Lindisfarne  from 1970 until his death.

Bates was educated at the Liverpool Institute   and Brasenose College, Oxford. He was ordained in 1936 after studying at Wycliffe Hall, Oxford; and began his ecclesiastical career as a curate at SS John and James, Litherland. After this he was Curate in Charge of Netherton and then held incumbencies in [Everton, Liverpool|Everton] and was appointed vicar of St Lukes Crosby thenJesmond until his Archdeacon’s appointment.

References

1912 births
People educated at Liverpool Institute High School for Boys
Alumni of Brasenose College, Oxford
Alumni of Wycliffe Hall, Oxford
Archdeacons of Lindisfarne
1980 deaths